Charles Stuart Kaufman (born November 19, 1958) is an American screenwriter, producer, director and novelist. He wrote the films Being John Malkovich (1999), Adaptation (2002), and Eternal Sunshine of the Spotless Mind (2004). He made his directorial debut with Synecdoche, New York (2008), which film critic Roger Ebert called "the best movie of the decade" in 2009. Further directorial work include the stop motion animated film Anomalisa (2015) and I'm Thinking of Ending Things (2020).

One of the most celebrated screenwriters of his era, Kaufman has been nominated for four Academy Awards: twice for Best Original Screenplay for Being John Malkovich and Eternal Sunshine of the Spotless Mind (winning for the latter), Best Adapted Screenplay (with his fictional brother) for Adaptation, and Best Animated Feature for Anomalisa. He also won two BAFTA Award for Best Original Screenplays and one BAFTA Award for Best Adapted Screenplay. Three of Kaufman's scripts appear in the Writers Guild of America's list of the 101 greatest movie screenplays ever written.

Major associations

Academy Awards

British Academy Film Awards

Golden Globe Awards

Independent Spirit Awards

Writers Guild of America

Festival awards

Cannes Film Festival

Venice Film Festival

Critics awards

Boston Society of Film Critics

Chicago Film Critics Association

Critics' Choice Movie Awards

Florida Film Critics Circle Award

London Film Critics' Circle Award

Los Angeles Film Critics Association

National Board of Review

National Society of Film Critics

New York Film Critics Circle Awards

Online Film Critics Society

San Diego Film Critics Society

Toronto Film Critics Association

Vancouver Film Critics Circle

Washington D.C. Critics Association

Miscellaneous awards

References

Kaufman, Charlie